Oncidium hastatum is a species of orchid native to Mexico and Honduras.

References

hastatum
Orchids of Mexico
Orchids of Honduras